Develi, formerly known as Averak, is a town and district in Kayseri Province in Central Anatolia Region,  Turkey.

History
The historical name of the town is Everek and it is called Averak (oren, ruin) in Armenian. The historian, geographer, who lived in the fourteenth century, gives the name of the butcher Mustavfi as Davalu. According to him, it was a medium-sized city and its walls were rebuilt by Seljuk Sultan Alaeddin. In the work called Cihannüma, written in the seventeenth century, the name of the town is called Davahlu.

According to historical sources, cultural traces of civilizations that lived in Develi between 2500-2000 BC have been found. There is still a need for scientific research in Develi, which hosts many civilizations in the historical process between the Copper Age, the Bronze Age and the Seljuk Period. From 1867 until 1922, Develi was part of Angora vilayet.

The Fatih Mosque of Lower Everek, which has its origins as a 200-year-old Armenian church in Everek quarter is making local news in recent years, since the decaying building had been first transformed into a mosque in 1978 and, when routine maintenance works were initiated in 1998, it was discovered that the interior decoration was still very much present, simply covered with plaster as they were during the 1978 transformation. The discovery led to an ongoing divergence of opinions between the national authority for foundations, responsible for maintenance of mosques in Turkey, which is in favor of covering the cross and Virgin Mary figures again, and Kayseri Governorship's cultural protection unit which advocates a restoration to their state of origin, a move that would put an end to the edifice's use as a mosque, this use currently being restrained to a part of the building until an official decision is made. In 2004, in order to protect the cultural heritage, the works were ordered to be stopped by the then mayor of Develi, Ali Ağca, while an intermediate solution was found in between.

Logo
The logo of the Develi Municipality features the Seyrani Monument and mausoleum of Dev Ali in front of Mount Erciyes among other elements such as flamingos. It is not to be confused with the corporate identity of Develi which features a Seljuk motif, or the red logo of the Develi Kaymakamlik.

See also
 Develi Chamber of Commerce
 Havadan Külliye

References

External sources
 Develi Municipality 
 Develi District Governorship 
 Develi web portal
 Krikorian, Aleksan. Evereg-Fenesse: Its Armenian History and Traditions. Detroit, MI: Evereg-Fenesse Mesrobian-Roupinian Educational Society, 1990. 186 pp.
 Evereg Fenesse Educational Society
 Der-Sarkissian, Jack. “A Tale of Twin Towns: Everek and Fenesse.” Armenian Kesaria/Kayseri and Cappadocia . Ed. Richard G. Hovannisian. Costa Mesa, California: Mazda Publishers, 2013. https://www.researchgate.net/publication/260676697_A_Tale_of_Twin_Towns_Everek_and_Fenesse

Kayseri
Populated places in Kayseri Province
 
Towns in Turkey